Panopea glycimeris is a species of large marine bivalve mollusc in the family Hiatellidae.

The fossil record of this species dates back to the Miocene of Italy (age range: 23.03 to 7.246 million years ago).

Description
The two valves are similars and have a rusty appearance. The diameter of the siphonal apertures ranges between 5 and 7 cm.

Distribution
This species can be found in the Mediterranean Sea and in the Northwestern coast of Africa, on sand bottom at depths of 10 to 100 m. It is actually rare in the Mediterranean Sea.

References

 Gofas, S.; Le Renard, J.; Bouchet, P. (2001). Mollusca. in: Costello, M.J. et al. (Ed.) (2001). European register of marine species: a check-list of the marine species in Europe and a bibliography of guides to their identification. Collection Patrimoines Naturels. 50: pp. 180–213.
 Repetto G., Orlando F. & Arduino G. (2005): Conchiglie del Mediterraneo, Amici del Museo "Federico Eusebio", Alba, Italy

Hiatellidae
Bivalves described in 1778